Rock Animals is a studio album by Shonen Knife. It was originally released on September 8, 1993 in Japan. It peaked at number 59 on the Oricon Albums Chart, as well as number 39 on Billboards Heatseekers Albums chart.

Track listing

Personnel
Credits adapted from the liner notes.

Shonen Knife
 Naoko Yamano – vocals, guitar, harmonica
 Michie Nakatani – vocals, bass guitar, keyboards
 Atsuko Yamano – vocals, drums, percussion

Additional musicians
 Thurston Moore – guitar (on "Butterfly Boy")
 Millie-Willy – vocals (on "Catnip Dream")
 Motoi Semba – keyboards, computer programming

Production
 Shonen Knife – producer
 Paige Porazzo – producer, executive producer
 Ohji Hayashi – recording engineer
 Jim Waters – recording engineer
 Akio Tanabe – recording engineer, mixing (on "Another Day" and "Music Square")
 Don Fleming – mixing (on all tracks except "Another Day" and "Music Square")

Charts

References

External links
 

1993 albums
Shonen Knife albums
MCA Records albums
Virgin Records albums
Creation Records albums